Kipkoech ("Kip") Cheruiyot (born December 2, 1964) is a retired middle distance runner from Kenya.

Biography
At the 1982 African Championships, he won 1500 metres gold medal, leaving the famous Saïd Aouita to second place. Cheruiyot was then slightly less than 18 years old.

In 1983, he broke the world junior record at men's 1500 metres by running 3:34.92 in Munich.

He represented Kenya at the Athletics at the 1988 Summer Olympics and finished 7th in the men's 1500 metres race, which was won by his compatriot Peter Rono. At the 1987 World championships, he was 11th in the 1500 metres final. At the 1984 Summer Olympics, he failed to reach the semifinals 

He was gold medalist at the 1989 Summer Universiade. At the time he was based at Mount St. Mary's University (College) located in Emmitsburg, Maryland.

His twin brother Charles Cheruiyot is also a former athlete.

Achievements

References

External links

External links

1964 births
Living people
Kenyan male middle-distance runners
Athletes (track and field) at the 1984 Summer Olympics
Athletes (track and field) at the 1988 Summer Olympics
Olympic athletes of Kenya
Universiade medalists in athletics (track and field)
Kenyan twins
Twin sportspeople
Universiade gold medalists for Kenya
20th-century Kenyan people